Summer Holiday is a 1948 American musical-comedy film, directed by Rouben Mamoulian and starring Mickey Rooney and Gloria DeHaven. The picture is based on the play Ah, Wilderness! (1933) by Eugene O'Neill, which had been filmed  under that name by MGM in 1935 with Rooney in a much smaller role, as the younger brother. Though completed in October 1946, this film sat on the shelf until 1948.

In addition to Walter Huston, the supporting cast features Frank Morgan as the drunken Uncle Sid, (a role originated in the stage play by Gene Lockhart, portrayed onscreen  by Wallace Beery in 1935 and later by Jackie Gleason on Broadway) as well as Marilyn Maxwell, Agnes Moorehead, Selena Royle and Anne Francis. One of producer Arthur Freed’s MGM musicals, it has costumes and cinematography that take full advantage of Technicolor.

Plot
The movie takes place in Danville, Connecticut, starting in June 1906. It centers around 17-year-old Richard Miller, who is about to graduate from high school, go to Yale, and step into the world of adults. He has a cynical view of the world because of all the books he has been reading. He has a girlfriend, Muriel McComber, whom he loves very much (she lives across the street) but she is afraid of being kissed. He tries to convince her as they sing “Afraid to Fall in Love.” He doesn't get the kiss but they do dance across the park.

Richard's father, Nat Miller, editor of the town newspaper, is a wise man with a sense of humor that serves him well in facing the challenges of parenthood. Richard has three other siblings: older brother Arthur, who is home on vacation from Yale; sister Mildred, and mischievous Tommy, the youngest.

Also living with the family are his Uncle Sid and Cousin Lily. They are usually on the verge of getting engaged, but the uncle's drinking gets in the way. Uncle Sid is leaving for a new job in Waterbury, in hopes of making good (he is nearly 50).

The graduating class enters the auditorium marching to the Danville High fight song and smoothly transitions to an elegiac Alma Mater, and the camera pans over touching vignettes of listening townspeople, including a deliberate recreations of Grant Wood’s "Daughters of Revolution," "Woman with Plants," and “American Gothic”. Richard, who is valedictorian, plans to give a Marxist call to arms, but he leaves his speech where his father can see it and, during a round of applause, Nat stops him before he can get to the revolutionary material. After the ceremony, his father asks him if his conscience will allow him to drive the family’s Stanley Steamer. A bright number built around the song “Stanley Steamer” follows.

Dawn on a peaceful morning; the town is hung with flags for the 4th of July. Suddenly explosions erupt all over town as boys and girls (and a young-at-heart grandfather) set off masses fireworks.

Richard, still spouting revolutionary propaganda and scorning the 4th, is surprised to find that his father has not only read Carlyle's “French Revolution,” but admires it—as he does the Rubáiyát of Omar Khayyam. Mother Essie, on the other hand, is horrified at Richard's choice of reading, which also includes Swinburne and Oscar Wilde's The Ballad of Reading Gaol, and says that this “is no kind of reading for a young boy.”

Uncle Sid appears, and Nat quickly realizes that he has been fired. To save him the embarrassment, he offers Sid his old job.

At the bandstand, a cornet player displays his skill, setting off the “Independence Day” number. A tableau recreating The Spirit of ‘76 takes a bow. Everyone celebrates at separate picnics; each area has its own routine  to go with “Independence Day.”

At the men's picnic, they have a beer-drinking contest, which Sid wins. At the women's picnic, they play croquet and share the delicacies they have cooked. The kids swim at the pond and the young people sing and dance.

No sooner has the Miller family returned home for dinner than Muriel's father arrives, accusing Richard of corrupting Muriel's morals. He saw Richard trying to kiss her. That was bad enough, but the letters Richard wrote to her are worse. When Nat Miller takes the whole things with a sense of humor, Macomber threatens him with loss of his advertising and storms out, leaving a farewell letter from Muriel to Richard, dictated by him. When Richard reads it, he is heartbroken, devastated and angry; he bursts into tears.

At the dinner table, a tipsy Sid has everyone laughing, but Lily weeps, saying that they all encourage him and laugh at him—and maybe they shouldn't. Richard launches into a diatribe about women driving men to drink and marches out of the house. At the front gate, his older brother's friend Wint (Hal Hackett) invites him on a double date with some “slick babies from New Haven.” They turn out to be a couple of dance hall girls. Wint and Crystal (Ruth Brady) leave immediately. Richard's girl, Belle (Marilyn Maxwell), takes him to a bar to drink, although he is underage.

Like the opening, this is a long scene mixing spoken and sung dialogue. It has a nightmarish quality that is enhanced by the  way Belle's costume changes, from pastel pink to scarlet and back, and the bright green wash of light over the background.

The bartender slips something into Richard's drink. He gets drunk but it has the opposite effect to what Belle expected. He starts trying to reform her.  Belle gets fed up with him and goes to sit with another guy. When that man points out that Richard is underage, the bartender throws him out. When Belle tells him that the boy is the son of a newspaper owner and could run him out of town, he throws Belle out.

Richard arrives home drunk and miserable. The next day, Belle writes to Nat, reporting the bartender for serving alcohol to an underage boy.

Meanwhile, Muriel finally finds a way to send a note of apology to Richard, through Tommy, saying she will always love him. They meet at night at the brook and finally kiss. “Won’t it be wonderful when we’re married!” Richard exclaims

He returns home in state of exaltation. His father says that it's about time that they had a serious talk about—“certain women.” Nat works himself into a state, hemming and hawing and mangling Richard's clay sculpture of Lincoln—and never completing a sentence. Finally, Richard, full of concern, gives his father a drink of water and tells him not to worry, he is going to marry Muriel. (The scene was written this way to get around the censor, who refused to approve any language that came near the subject of sex.)

Sid and Lili are in the swing, drinking lemonade. Mildred and Art are out walking with their sweethearts. Mr. Macomber and Nat have been reconciled, off camera. Richard's outlook on the future is now brighter and happier. “We are completely surrounded by love.” Nat says. Richard kisses his parents and goes out to look at the moon, waving goodnight to Muriel, who is standing in her bedroom window. Nat, surveying the scene, quotes the Rubaiyat and says to his wife, “Spring isn’t everything.”

Cast

Mickey Rooney as Richard Miller
Gloria DeHaven as Muriel
Walter Huston as Nat Miller
Frank Morgan as Uncle Sid
Jackie 'Butch' Jenkins as Tommy
Marilyn Maxwell as Belle
Agnes Moorehead as Cousin Lily
Selena Royle as Mrs. Miller
Michael Kirby as Arthur Miller
Shirley Johns as Mildred
Hal Hackett as Wint
Anne Francis as Elsie Rand
John Alexander as Mr. McComber
Virginia Brissac as Miss Hawley
Howard Freeman as Mr. Peabody
Emory Parnell as Danville Beach Club Bartender

Production 
Director Rouben Mamoulian saw this project as an opportunity to create a very different kind of “musical play” and he gave songwriters Ralph Blane (lyrics) and Harry Warren (music) specific instructions on what he wanted to do.

The result can be seen in the opening sequence, “Our Home Town,” begun by Nat Miller, who introduces us to the town and to the family. The sequence segues back and forth and back again into lines that are sung, lines that are spoken in rhyme, and lines that are read straight, and ends in the soda fountain. The length of this sequence may be the root of the incorrect idea that the whole film is written in rhyme.

Reception
The film was a disappointment at the box office, earning only $1,208,000 in the US and Canada and $401,000 elsewhere, resulting in a loss of $1,460,000. Today it is considered a minor classic, “largely because of Mamoulian’s innovative approach.”

Notes

External links

 

1948 films
1940s historical musical films
American films based on plays
American historical musical films
1940s English-language films
Films based on works by Eugene O'Neill
Films set in 1906
Films set in Connecticut
Films directed by Rouben Mamoulian
Films produced by Arthur Freed
Independence Day (United States) films
Metro-Goldwyn-Mayer films
Films with screenplays by Irving Brecher
1940s American films